is a contemporary Japanese composer, music teacher, musicologist and conductor.

Biography
Shitanda studied at the Tokyo University of the Arts under Mareo Ishiketa (石桁眞禮生), Toshiro Mayuzumi and Kenjiro Urata (浦田健次郎) graduating in 1979 with a degree in music composition. He is currently professor at Akita University where he teaches composition. Also, he is part-time lecturer at Seirei Women's Junior College in Akita and guest lecturer at Trinity College of Music in London.

Shitanda is a member of the Japan Federation of Composers and Bandmasters Academic Society of Japan (Academic Society of Japan for Winds Percussion and Band).

Selected works 
  (1995)
  (1998)
  (2000)
  (2000)
  (2002)
  (2003)
  (2004)
  (2005)

Orchestra
 Symphony No.1 (1994)
  (2003)

Concert band 
 Festal March (フェスタル・マーチ) (1984)
 March in Blue (マーチ・イン・ブルー) (1988)
 , Fantasia for Concert Band (1989)
  (1990)

Concertante
 Concerto for viola and orchestra (1998)
 Karavinka (カラヴィンカ), Concerto for (25-string or 20-string) koto with string orchestra, percussion and harp (2008)

Chamber music
 Pastoral for flute and piano (1992)
 Fantasy for clarinet solo (1995)
  for viola and piano (1997)
  for marimba (2005)

Works for traditional Japanese instruments 
  for koto and marimba (1999)
  for koto ensemble (1986)
  for 2 kotos (2004)
 Two Movements (独奏十七絃のための二章) for solo jūshichi-gen (1983)
 , Monodrama for male voice and jūshichi-gen (2000); after the short story by Ryūnosuke Akutagawa

Choral
 , Composition for female chorus and chamber orchestra (1981)

References

External links 
 Motoyuki Shitanda – Akita University profile page 

1952 births
20th-century classical composers
20th-century Japanese male musicians
21st-century classical composers
21st-century Japanese male musicians
Japanese classical composers
Japanese contemporary classical composers
Japanese male classical composers
Living people
Tokyo University of the Arts alumni
Academic staff of Akita University